"Metropolis—Part I: 'The Miracle and the Sleeper'" (often shortened to "Metropolis I") is a song by the American progressive metal band Dream Theater, from their 1992 album Images and Words.

It was released as a promotional one-track cassette.

History
"Metropolis—Part I: 'The Miracle and the Sleeper'" was originally known as "Crumbling Metropolis." Sometime around 1989, "Crumbling" was dropped. "Part I" in the title was originally added by John Petrucci as a joke, as no sequel was ever intended. As fan demands began to increase, however, the popularity of the song eventually led to a second song being written. The second song was originally conceived as a twenty-minute epic for Falling into Infinity; it was cut from that album at an early state, before the song was completed. Lyrics for "Metropolis Pt. 2" were never written and the only recording of the whole song is a rough rehearsal. These song bits evolved into their own album, Metropolis Pt. 2: Scenes from a Memory.

Live performances
Much like "Pull Me Under", "Metropolis" is one of the band's most popular live songs, and is played often and with many variations. The song instantly became a live favorite even before the song's actual release, opening many of Dream Theater's early shows. The song was originally written when original singer Charlie Dominici was in the band, and was played live at every show in 1989, although this version had a different intro and a slightly shorter outro. In recent years, it has often been performed as the final encore, allowing the band to extend the solo section and James LaBrie to address the crowd. This version was released on Live at Luna Park. Metropolis has also been played as part of many medleys, including "Metropolis"/"Learning to Live"/"The Crimson Sunset", which closed Once in a LIVEtime, the "Instrumedley", which was included on the Live at Budokan album, and "Pullmeopolis", a mashup with "Pull Me Under" that has never been commercially released. In total, it has been played live 638 times as of December 2017, making it Dream Theater's second most played song after "Pull Me Under".

Use in media
"Metropolis" is featured in the 2015 music video game Rock Band 4, where it is considered one of the hardest songs.

Track listing

Personnel

Dream Theater 
 James LaBrie – vocals
 Kevin Moore – keyboards
 John Myung – bass
 John Petrucci – guitars
 Mike Portnoy – drums, percussion

Releases 
 Cassette, Single, Promo – Atco, US 1992

References

Dream Theater songs
1992 songs
Songs written by James LaBrie
Songs written by John Myung
Songs written by John Petrucci
Songs written by Mike Portnoy